There are 98 Division III teams in the National Junior College Athletic Association (NJCAA) that play in 24 different regions.

Members

Connecticut
Briarwood College Wildcats in Southington
Gateway Community College Lions in New Haven
University of Connecticut at Avery Point Pointers in Groton

Georgia
Oxford College of Emory University Eagles in Oxford

Illinois
College of DuPage Chaparrals in Glen Ellyn
Harper College Hawks in Palatine
Joliet Junior College Wolves in Joliet
Rock Valley College Golden Eagles in Rockford

Kentucky
Elizabethtown Community and Technical College Barons in Elizabethtown

Maryland
Anne Arundel Community College Riverhawks in Arnold
Prince George's Community College Owls in Largo

Massachusetts
Benjamin Franklin Institute of Technology Shockers in Boston
Bristol Community College Bayhawks in Fall River
Bunker Hill Community College Bulldogs in Charlestown
Holyoke Community College Cougars in Holyoke
Mass Bay Community College Buccaneers in Wellesley
Northern Essex Community College Knights in Haverhill
Quinsigamond Community College Chiefs in Worcester
Roxbury Community College Tigers in Boston
Springfield Technical Community College Rams in Springfield

Minnesota
Anoka-Ramsey Community College Golden Rams in Coon Rapids
Central Lakes College Red Raiders in Brainerd
Hibbing Community College Cardinals in Hibbing
Itasca Community College Vikings in Grand Rapids
Mesabi Range College Norse in Virginia
Minneapolis Community & Technical College Mavericks in Minneapolis
Minnesota State Community & Technical College Spartans in Fergus Falls
Minnesota West Community & Technical College Bluejays in Worthington
Northland Community & Technical College Pioneers in Thief River Falls
Rainy River Community College Voyageurs in International Falls
Ridgewater College Warriors in Wilmar
Riverland Community College Blue Devils in Austin
Rochester Community & Technical College Yellowjackets in Rochester
Vermilion Community College Ironmen/Ironwomen in Ely

New Jersey
Atlantic Cape Community College Buccaneers in Mays Landing
Bergen Community College Bulldogs in Paramus
Brookdale Community College Jersey Blues in Lincroft
Camden County College Cougars in Blackwood
Cumberland County College Dukes in Vineland
Gloucester County College Roadrunners in Sewell
Middlesex County College Colts in Edison
Ocean County College Vikings in Toms River
Passaic County Community College Panthers in Paterson
Raritan Valley Community College Lions in North Branch
Sussex County Community College Skylanders in Newton
Union County College Owls in Cranford

New York
Adirondack Community College Wolves in Queensbury
Borough of Manhattan Community College Panthers in New York City
Bronx Community College Broncos in University Heights
Broome Community College Hornets in Binghamton
Cayuga Community College Spartans in Auburn
Clinton Community College, New York Cougars in Plattsburgh
Columbia-Greene Community College Twins in Hudson
Corning Community College Red Barons in Corning
Dutchess Community College Falcons in Poughkeepsie
Fashion Institute of Technology Tigers in New York City
Finger Lakes Community College Lakers in Canandaigua
Fulton-Montgomery Community College Raiders in Johnstown
Genesee Community College Cougars in Batavia
Herkimer County Community College Generals in Herkimer
Hostos Community College Caimans in Bronx
Jefferson Community College Cannoneers in Watertown
Kingsborough Community College Wave in Brooklyn
Mohawk Valley Community College Hawks in Utica
Nassau Community College Lions in Garden City
North Country Community College Saints in Saranac
Onondaga Community College Lazers in Syracuse
Queensborough Community College Tigers in Queens
Rockland Community College Fighting Hawks in Viola
Schenectady County Community College Royals in Schenectady
Suffolk County Community College Sharks in Selden
Sullivan County Community College Generals in Loch Sheldrake
Tompkins Cortland Community College Panthers in Dryden
Ulster County Community College Senators in Stone Ridge

North Carolina
Caldwell Community College & Technical Institute Cobras in Caldwell
Catawba Valley Community College Buccaneers in Hickory
Central Carolina Community College Cougars in Sanford
Davidson County Community College Storm in Lexington
Rockingham Community College Eagles in Wentworth
Sandhills Community College Flyers in Pinehurst
Vance–Granville Community College Vanguards in Henderson

Ohio
Lorain County Community College Commodores in Elyria
Hocking Technical College Hawks in Nelsonville

Pennsylvania
Butler County Community College (Pennsylvania) Pioneers in Butler
Community College of Allegheny County Cougars in Pittsburgh
Westmoreland County Community College Wolfpack in Youngwood
Thaddeus Stevens College of Technology Bulldogs in Lancaster
Northampton Community College Spartans in Bethlehem

Texas
Brookhaven College Bears in Farmers Branch
Cedar Valley College Suns in Lancaster
Eastfield College Harvesters in Mesquite
Mountain View College (Texas) Lions in Dallas
North Lake College Blazers in Irving
Richland College Thunderduck in Dallas

Virginia 
Thomas Nelson Community College Gators in Hampton

West Virginia
Potomac State College Catamounts in Keyser

Wisconsin
Madison Area Technical College WolfPack in Madison
Mid-State Technical College Cougars in Marshfield
Milwaukee Area Technical College Stormers in Milwaukee
Western Technical College Cavaliers in LaCrosse

See also
List of NJCAA Division I schools
List of NJCAA Division II schools
List of community college football programs
List of USCAA institutions
List of NCCAA institutions
List of NAIA institutions
List of NCAA Division I institutions
List of NCAA Division II institutions
List of NCAA Division III institutions

Sources
NJCAA Members
NJCAA archived

Division 3